The United States Army DEVCOM Ground Vehicle Systems Center (GVSC) (formerly United States Army Tank Automotive Research, Development and Engineering Center (TARDEC)), located in Warren, Michigan, is the United States Armed Forces' research and development facility for advanced technology in ground systems. It is part of the U.S. Army Combat Capabilities Development Command (DEVCOM), a major subordinate command of the U.S. Army Futures Command. GVSC shares its facilities with the United States Army Tank-automotive and Armaments Command (TACOM). Current technology focus areas include Ground Vehicle Power and Mobility (GVPM), Ground System Survivability and Force Protection, among others.

Laboratories
It features a number of research laboratories, including:
 Laser Protection Laboratory
 Crew Station Systems Integration Laboratory
 Robotic Systems Integration Laboratory
 Ground Vehicle Simulation Laboratory — ride motion simulator, pintle motion based simulator, crew station/turret motion based simulator and several vehicle "shaker" facilities
 High Performance Computing Laboratory — supports virtual prototyping and design development of combat vehicles and improves virtual reality capabilities
 Next Generation Software Laboratory
 Water Laboratory
 Petroleum Laboratory — researches properties and durability of a wide range of fuel including JP-8, Diesel, hydraulic fluids and lubricants
 Bridging Simulation Laboratory — Located at Selfridge Air National Guard base, this facility features computer-controlled load test areas with automated data acquisition capability for structural testing of bridging systems. Laboratory capabilities include static and dynamic structural load application for structural and fatigue testing.
 Propulsion Test Laboratory
 Physical and Rapid Prototyping Laboratory
 Advanced Materials and Manufacturing Center — researches a variety of alternative vehicle structural materials, including composite materials
 Center for Systems Integration (CSI)
 Advanced joining research facility (fusion & friction stir welding, adhesives and mechanical fasteners)
 Vehicle Protection Integration Laboratory (VPIL)
 Ground System Power and Energy Laboratory (GSPEL) (opened April 2012)
 Power and Energy Vehicle Environment Laboratory (PEVEL)
 Fuel Cell Research Laboratory
 Energy Storage Laboratory
 Air Filtration Laboratory
 Electric Components Laboratory
 Power Laboratory
 Thermal Management Laboratory
 Calorimeter Laboratory

Robotic Power and Energy Vehicle Environmental Laboratory (Opened 2021)

Relationship with Industry 
U.S. Army GVSC maintains collaborative partnerships with a spectrum of defense and automotive industry entities with the purpose of co-developing key ground vehicle technologies while leveraging industry technology advancements and economy-of-scale.  These relationships are formalized through one of a variety of mechanisms, including formal contracts, Other Transaction Agreements, and Cooperative Research and Development Agreements, among others.  Occasionally these relationships extend to non-industry entities also, as with the Michigan Department of Transportation and various academic institutions.

Next Generation Combat Vehicle 
U.S. Army GVSC is the lead Science and Technology (S&T) Center for the Next Generation Combat Vehicle (NGCV).  As such, it investigates the technologies and develops the capabilities supporting the NGCV requirements.  The NGCV is one of the U.S. Army's six modernization priorities.

Robotic Vehicles 
U.S. Army GVSC is the Department of Defense's lead agency for automated, driver-optional, and driver-assist technology development for ground vehicles.  Developed within its Ground Vehicle Robotics portfolio, these technologies apply through the common, open-source Robotics Operating System-Military to tactical and combat vehicle platforms and applications.

Automated Ground Resupply 
GVSC furthers the development of autonomous driving in resupply activities through its Automated Ground Resupply (AGR) program.  The keystone project in this program is its AMAS, or Automated Mobility Applique System, an applique kit that enables automated, driver-optional, and driver-assist behaviors to current Army vehicle platforms.  This technology is intended to manifest as "leader-follower" or "platooning" of line-haul resupply vehicles in which a lead vehicle is manually driven, remotely-driven, or driven autonomously through waypoint navigation and the follower vehicles in a convoy are fed driving instructions from the lead vehicle.

Automated Convoy Testing on Interstate Highways 
In 2016, and again in 2017, U.S. Army GVSC with the Michigan Department of Transportation conducted tests and demonstrations of its leader-follower technology on Interstate 69 and across the Blue Water Bridge in Eastern Michigan.  The tests, intended to exercise the Dedicated Short Range Communications radios installed both in the vehicles and along the roadways, demonstrated the effectiveness of Vehicle-to-Vehicle (V2V) and Vehicle-to-Infrastructure (V2I) communications along the interstate.  Further tests are expected in conjunction with the American Center for Mobility in Ypsilanti, Michigan.

Fuel Cell Electric vehicles
Through a cooperative partnership with General Motors, U.S. Army GVSC characterized and demonstrated the unique fuel cell-equipped Chevrolet Colorado ZH2 in 2017–2018, highlighting the center's pursuit and development of technologies that are nearing a level of readiness applicable to the military.  U.S. Army GVSC indicates the technology may provide silent vehicle mobility, power generation, enhanced low-end torque, a reduction in the vehicle's thermal signature, and a broader flexibility for fuel sources.  Jointly unveiled by General Motors and U.S. Army GVSC at the 2016 annual meeting of the Association of the United States Army, the vehicle's demonstrations completed in 2018 and follow-on projects are anticipated.

Fuel Efficient Ground Vehicle Demonstrator
U.S. Army GVSC designs vehicles and vehicle components that integrate a wide variety of technologies to demonstrate the state-of-the-art in fuel efficient vehicle design.

The FED's objectives include:
Identifying and assessing technologies that support increasing fuel efficiency and reducing fuel consumption for light tactical vehicles.
Developing and assessing fuel efficient tactical vehicle concepts that compare favorably and achieve the same operational capabilities of a HMMWV.
Developing, fabricating, and testing two system-level demonstrators that incorporate fuel-efficient technologies. The two demonstrator vehicles are named "Alpha" and "Bravo".
Training the next generation of government engineers in fuel efficiency processes and tools.

FED "Alpha" fabrication was completed in October 2010. FED Alpha is powered by a super/turbocharged 200 horsepower 4.5-litre inline 4-cylinder Diesel engine optimized for fuel efficiency. Alpha also includes other fuel-saving subsystems, such as an integrated starter generator, lightweight hull, low rolling resistance tires, driver feedback systems, solar panels, low-drag brakes, superfinishing of driveline components, and other technologies.

Bravo was to have a road-coupled parallel hybrid powertrain.

See also

 Humvee
 Intelligent Ground Vehicle Competition
 Lawrence Technological University
 List of U.S. military vehicles by model number
 Medium Mine Protected Vehicle
 MillenWorks Light Utility Vehicle
 Multi Autonomous Ground-robotic International Challenge
 Office of Naval Research
 Plug-in vehicle
United States Army Combat Capabilities Development Command

References

Notes

Sources
govinfo.library.unt.edu

CCDC Ground Vehicle Systems Center
CCDC Ground Vehicle Systems Center
Military simulation
Hybrid electric vehicles
Buildings and structures in Macomb County, Michigan
Warren, Michigan